Montserrat García Riberaygua (born 26 November 1989 in Andorra la Vella) is an Andorran slalom canoer who has competed since the mid-2000s. She was eliminated in the qualifying round of the K-1 event at the 2008 Summer Olympics in Beijing, finishing in 20th place.

Notes

References

External links
 
 

1989 births
Living people
Andorran female canoeists
Olympic canoeists of Andorra
Canoeists at the 2008 Summer Olympics